Mukesh Diwan (born 15 June 1976) is an Indian former cricketer. He played two first-class matches for Delhi in 2005.

See also
 List of Delhi cricketers

References

External links
 

1976 births
Living people
Indian cricketers
Delhi cricketers
Cricketers from Delhi